Emanuel Benito Rivas (born March 17, 1983, in Quilmes) is an Argentine former football midfielder who last played for the Italian club Livorno.

Career

From Independiente to Vitória SC
Rivas started his career in 1999 with Independiente in the Primera Division Argentina. He was part of the Independiente squad that won the Apertura 2002 championship, ending a 7-year drought without a single title.

In 2004, he moved to Avellaneda's 3rd club; Arsenal de Sarandí but after only one season with Arsenal he was signed by Vitória SC of Portugal.

From Arezzo to Varese
After six months with Serie C1 club Arezzo, he was noted by then-Serie B club Bari who signed him in June 2008. He also played regularly in the club's comeback season to Serie A in 2009–10.

Since 30 January 2012 he plays for the club of Varese.

Honours

External links
 Argentine Primera statistics

Argentine footballers
Argentine expatriate footballers
Association football midfielders
Club Atlético Independiente footballers
Arsenal de Sarandí footballers
Vitória S.C. players
Iraklis Thessaloniki F.C. players
Talleres de Córdoba footballers
S.S. Arezzo players
S.S.C. Bari players
S.S.D. Varese Calcio players
Hellas Verona F.C. players
Spezia Calcio players
Expatriate footballers in Italy
Expatriate footballers in Greece
Expatriate footballers in Portugal
Argentine expatriate sportspeople in Greece
Argentine expatriate sportspeople in Italy
Argentine expatriate sportspeople in Portugal
People from Quilmes
1983 births
Living people
Serie A players
Serie B players
Primeira Liga players
Super League Greece players
Argentine Primera División players
Sportspeople from Buenos Aires Province